The 3rd constituency of Aude is a French legislative constituency in the Aude département.

Description

It is located in the west of the Department running from north to south. It is mainly rural, but includes the towns of Castelnaudary and Limoux.

Deputies

Election results

2022

 
 
 
 
 
 
 
 
|-
| colspan="8" bgcolor="#E9E9E9"|
|-

2017

2012

|- style="background-color:#E9E9E9;text-align:center;"
! colspan="2" rowspan="2" style="text-align:left;" | Candidate
! rowspan="2" colspan="2" style="text-align:left;" | Party
! colspan="2" | 1st round
! colspan="2" | 2nd round
|- style="background-color:#E9E9E9;text-align:center;"
! width="75" | Votes
! width="30" | %
! width="75" | Votes
! width="30" | %
|-
| style="background-color:" |
| style="text-align:left;" | Jean-Paul Dupre
| style="text-align:left;" | Socialist Party
| PS
| 
| 44.96%
| 
| 62.95%
|-
| style="background-color:" |
| style="text-align:left;" | Emmanuel Bresson
| style="text-align:left;" | Union for a Popular Movement
| UMP
| 
| 22.55%
| 
| 37.05%
|-
| style="background-color:" |
| style="text-align:left;" | Marie-Josée Sutter
| style="text-align:left;" | National Front
| FN
| 
| 15.72%
| colspan="2" style="text-align:left;" |
|-
| style="background-color:" |
| style="text-align:left;" | Marie-Angèle Larruy
| style="text-align:left;" | Left Front
| FG
| 
| 8.10%
| colspan="2" style="text-align:left;" |
|-
| style="background-color:" |
| style="text-align:left;" | Lidwine Kempf
| style="text-align:left;" | Regionalist
| REG
| 
| 2.54%
| colspan="2" style="text-align:left;" |
|-
| style="background-color:" |
| style="text-align:left;" | Jean-Pierre Quaglieri
| style="text-align:left;" | Miscellaneous Left
| DVG
| 
| 2.53%
| colspan="2" style="text-align:left;" |
|-
| style="background-color:" |
| style="text-align:left;" | Jacques Cros
| style="text-align:left;" | Ecologist
| ECO
| 
| 1.66%
| colspan="2" style="text-align:left;" |
|-
| style="background-color:" |
| style="text-align:left;" | André Arrans
| style="text-align:left;" | New Centre-Presidential Majority
| NCE
| 
| 0.70%
| colspan="2" style="text-align:left;" |
|-
| style="background-color:" |
| style="text-align:left;" | Dominique Galonnier
| style="text-align:left;" | Far Left
| EXG
| 
| 0.53%
| colspan="2" style="text-align:left;" |
|-
| style="background-color:" |
| style="text-align:left;" | Patrick Dhersin
| style="text-align:left;" | Ecologist
| ECO
| 
| 0.38%
| colspan="2" style="text-align:left;" |
|-
| style="background-color:" |
| style="text-align:left;" | Maria Lesoeur
| style="text-align:left;" | Regionalist
| REG
| 
| 0.32%
| colspan="2" style="text-align:left;" |
|-
| colspan="8" style="background-color:#E9E9E9;"|
|- style="font-weight:bold"
| colspan="4" style="text-align:left;" | Total
| 
| 100%
| 
| 100%
|-
| colspan="8" style="background-color:#E9E9E9;"|
|-
| colspan="4" style="text-align:left;" | Registered voters
| 
| style="background-color:#E9E9E9;"|
| 
| style="background-color:#E9E9E9;"|
|-
| colspan="4" style="text-align:left;" | Blank/Void ballots
| 
| 1.92%
| 
| 4.92%
|-
| colspan="4" style="text-align:left;" | Turnout
| 
| 64.82%
| 
| 61.99%
|-
| colspan="4" style="text-align:left;" | Abstentions
| 
| 35.18%
| 
| 38.01%
|-
| colspan="8" style="background-color:#E9E9E9;"|
|- style="font-weight:bold"
| colspan="6" style="text-align:left;" | Result
| colspan="2" style="background-color:" | PS HOLD
|}

2007

|- style="background-color:#E9E9E9;text-align:center;"
! colspan="2" rowspan="2" style="text-align:left;" | Candidate
! rowspan="2" colspan="2" style="text-align:left;" | Party
! colspan="2" | 1st round
! colspan="2" | 2nd round
|- style="background-color:#E9E9E9;text-align:center;"
! width="75" | Votes
! width="30" | %
! width="75" | Votes
! width="30" | %
|-
| style="background-color:" |
| style="text-align:left;" | Jean-Paul Dupre
| style="text-align:left;" | Socialist Party
| PS
| 
| 41.86%
| 
| 58.38%
|-
| style="background-color:" |
| style="text-align:left;" | Jean Salvignol
| style="text-align:left;" | Union for a Popular Movement
| UMP
| 
| 33.08%
| 
| 41.62%
|-
| style="background-color:" |
| style="text-align:left;" | René Caunes
| style="text-align:left;" | Democratic Movement
| MoDem
| 
| 5.03%
| colspan="2" style="text-align:left;" |
|-
| style="background-color:" |
| style="text-align:left;" | Paule Mercier
| style="text-align:left;" | National Front
| FN
| 
| 4.37%
| colspan="2" style="text-align:left;" |
|-
| style="background-color:" |
| style="text-align:left;" | Marie-Ange Larruy
| style="text-align:left;" | Communist
| COM
| 
| 3.37%
| colspan="2" style="text-align:left;" |
|-
| style="background-color:" |
| style="text-align:left;" | Annabelle Pujol
| style="text-align:left;" | Far Left
| EXG
| 
| 3.16%
| colspan="2" style="text-align:left;" |
|-
| style="background-color:" |
| style="text-align:left;" | Josiane Hograindleur
| style="text-align:left;" | The Greens
| VEC
| 
| 2.52%
| colspan="2" style="text-align:left;" |
|-
| style="background-color:" |
| style="text-align:left;" | Jean-François Leclerc
| style="text-align:left;" | Movement for France
| MPF
| 
| 1.64%
| colspan="2" style="text-align:left;" |
|-
| style="background-color:" |
| style="text-align:left;" | Patrice Mallet
| style="text-align:left;" | Hunting, Fishing, Nature, Traditions
| CPNT
| 
| 1.59%
| colspan="2" style="text-align:left;" |
|-
| style="background-color:" |
| style="text-align:left;" | Lucette Pinel
| style="text-align:left;" | Divers
| DIV
| 
| 0.85%
| colspan="2" style="text-align:left;" |
|-
| style="background-color:" |
| style="text-align:left;" | Yvette Lestrade
| style="text-align:left;" | Ecologist
| ECO
| 
| 0.81%
| colspan="2" style="text-align:left;" |
|-
| style="background-color:" |
| style="text-align:left;" | Dominique Galonnier
| style="text-align:left;" | Far Left
| EXG
| 
| 0.71%
| colspan="2" style="text-align:left;" |
|-
| style="background-color:" |
| style="text-align:left;" | Erick Mercher
| style="text-align:left;" | Far Right
| EXD
| 
| 0.62%
| colspan="2" style="text-align:left;" |
|-
| style="background-color:" |
| style="text-align:left;" | Jean-Jacques Rabineau
| style="text-align:left;" | Majorité Présidentielle
| 
| 
| 0.39%
| colspan="2" style="text-align:left;" |
|-
| style="background-color:" |
| style="text-align:left;" | Martin de Soos
| style="text-align:left;" | Miscellaneous Right
| DVD
| 
| 0.00%
| colspan="2" style="text-align:left;" |
|-
| colspan="8" style="background-color:#E9E9E9;"|
|- style="font-weight:bold"
| colspan="4" style="text-align:left;" | Total
| 
| 100%
| 
| 100%
|-
| colspan="8" style="background-color:#E9E9E9;"|
|-
| colspan="4" style="text-align:left;" | Registered voters
| 
| style="background-color:#E9E9E9;"|
| 
| style="background-color:#E9E9E9;"|
|-
| colspan="4" style="text-align:left;" | Blank/Void ballots
| 
| 2.25%
| 
| 3.62%
|-
| colspan="4" style="text-align:left;" | Turnout
| 
| 68.08%
| 
| 68.83%
|-
| colspan="4" style="text-align:left;" | Abstentions
| 
| 31.92%
| 
| 31.17%
|-
| colspan="8" style="background-color:#E9E9E9;"|
|- style="font-weight:bold"
| colspan="6" style="text-align:left;" | Result
| colspan="2" style="background-color:" | PS HOLD
|}

2002

 
 
 
 
 
 
 
|-
| colspan="8" bgcolor="#E9E9E9"|
|-

1997

 
 
 
 
 
 
 
|-
| colspan="8" bgcolor="#E9E9E9"|
|-

References

Sources
French Interior Ministry results website: 

3